Recado rojo or achiote paste is a popular blend of spices. It is now strongly associated with Mexican and Belizean cuisines, especially of Yucatán and Oaxaca. The spice mixture usually includes annatto, oregano, cumin, clove, cinnamon, black pepper, allspice, garlic, and salt. The annatto seeds dye the mixture red, and impart a distinctive red-orange color to the food. 

The paste is dissolved in either lemon juice, water, oil, or vinegar, used as a marinade for meat, or rubbed directly upon it. The meat is then grilled, baked, barbecued, or broiled. Sometimes, it is added to corn dough to create a zesty flavor and color in empanadas and red tamales. It may also be an ingredient when making tacos al pastor or chorizo.

References

Herb and spice mixtures
Mexican cuisine
Belizean cuisine
Cuisine of Yucatán
Food paste